William Francis Murphy (born May 14, 1940) is an American prelate of the Roman Catholic Church.  He served as bishop of the Diocese of Rockville Centre on Long Island, New York, from 2001 to 2016 and as an auxiliary bishop of the Archdiocese of Boston in Massachusetts from 1995 to 2001.

Biography

Early life 
William Murphy was born in Boston, Massachusetts on May 14, 1940.  He received his secondary education at Boston Latin School in Boston, then attended Saint John's Seminary in Boston, receiving his Bachelor of Arts degree in 1961. He was then sent to Rome to study at the Pontifical Gregorian University.

Priesthood

Service in Rome 
Murphy was ordained a priest of the Archdiocese of Boston at Saint Peter’s Basilica in Vatican City by Bishop Francis Reh on December 16, 1964. Murphy would remain in Rome until 1987, studying, teaching and serving in papal agencies.

Murphy received his Licentiate in Sacred Theology in 1965 from the Gregorian University.  In 1972, he was appointed as a lecturer in theology at the Gregorian and in 1974 received his Doctor of Sacred Theology degree from the University.  Murphy in 1974 also became an official in the Pontifical Council for Justice and Peace.  He became a lecturer in theology at University of Saint Thomas Aquinas in Rome in 1976, teaching there for the next four years.  He was named chaplain of his holiness by the Vatican in 1979.  In 1980, Murphy was appointed as undersecretary of the Pontifical Council for Justice and Peace.  He would hold that post until 1987, when returned to Boston after 23 years in Rome.

Service in Boston 
After returning to Boston in 1987, Murphy was appointed as secretary of community relations for the archdiocese, director of the Office of Social Justice and director of the Pope John XXIII Seminary in Weston, Massachusetts,  Murphy would hold all three positions until 1993. In 1987, he was named a prelate of honor by the Vatican.  He also lectured on social ethics at St. John’s Seminary. 

In 1993, Murphy was appointed vicar general and moderator of the curia for the archdiocese. In this role, he was the principal assistant to Cardinal Bernard Law, responsible for clergy.

Auxiliary Bishop of Boston 
Pope John Paul II appointed Murphy as an auxiliary bishop of the Archdiocese of Boston on November 21, 1995.  He was consecrated on December 27, 1995 by Cardinal Law.

Bishop of Rockville Centre 
John Paul II appointed Murphy as bishop of the Diocese of Rockville Centre on June 26, 2001. He was installed on September 5, 2001.He signed the 1994 document Evangelicals and Catholics Together. In 2007, he was appointed the head of the Domestic Policy Committee of the U.S. Conference of Catholic Bishops (USCCB). He is fluent in English, Italian, French and Spanish.

Massachusetts report 
On July 23, 2003, Massachusetts Attorney General Thomas F. Reilly released the report The Sexual Abuse of Children in the Roman Catholic Archdiocese of Boston. The report described Murphy, when auxiliary bishop in the archdiocese, as being in close consultation with Cardinal Law on sexual abuse issues with clergy. The report stated that Murphy did some positive things, but it presented this evaluation of his actions:Bishop Murphy did not report to law enforcement any of the numerous allegations of clerical sexual abuse he reviewed nor did he ever advise the cardinal to do so.  And even with undeniable information available to him, Bishop Murphy continued to place a higher priority on preventing scandal and providing support to alleged abusers than on protecting children from sexual abuse.In response to the report, Murphy claimed that another archdiocesan official was in charge of these cases..On August 3, 2003, in response to the attorney general report, the Long Island chapter of the group Voice of the Faithful called for Murphy to resign as bishop. Murphy banned Voice of the Faithful from meeting on diocese property soon after that declaration. 

Monsignor Alan J. Placa, a Rockville Centre diocesan priest, was cleared by the tribunal of the Diocese of Albany, the home diocese of the complainant, of allegations made against him in June 2002. The decision was subsequently confirmed by the Congregation for the Doctrine of the Faith, which instructed Murphy "to do what we can to restore his good name.”

Renovation of bishop's quarters 
Soon after Murphy was installed as Bishop of Rockville Centre in 2001, he decided that his private quarters in the cathedral rectory lacked privacy and sufficient space to entertain visiting clergy. He decided to take over the top floor of an old convent building at the cathedral.  The diocese had been planning to create rooms for nuns on that floor, but Murphy asked them to accept some different accommodations.  The project ended up costing $800,000.  As news of the project and its cost became public, Murphy invited a Newsday reporter and photographer to tour the apartment.. They reported that the residence included a large suite with a new fireplace with an oak mantel, a temperature-controlled wine storage cabinet, and a marble bathroom.

Meeting with clergy 
In October 2003, 52 priests requested a meeting with Murphy after sending a letter that spoke of anger and dissatisfaction within the diocese and "a certain lack of confidence in your pastoral leadership." Issues raised included Murphy's management style, the cost of his new living quarters, the sexual abuse scandal in Boston and his ban against Long Island Voice of the Faithful.

Catholic school closings 
On December 5, 2011, Murphy announced the closing of six Catholic elementary schools on Long Island:

 St. John Baptist de La Salle Regional School in Farmingdale
 St. Catherine of Sienna School in Franklin Square 
 St. Ignatius Loyola School in Hicksville 
 Sacred Heart School in North Merrick
 Our Lady of Perpetual Help School in Lindenhurst 
 Prince of Peace Regional School in Sayville

Resignation 
On reaching age 75, the mandatory retirement age for bishops, Murphy sent a letter of resignation as bishop of the Diocese Rockville Centre to the pope.  On December 9, 2016, Pope Francis accepted his resignation.

Honors and awards 

 Honorary Doctor of Theology degree from Assumption College in Worcester, Massachusetts, in 1999
 Honorary Doctor of Humane Letters degree from Salem State College, in Salem, Massachusetts, in 1999. 
 Rabin Peacemaker Award from Merrimack College in North Andover, Massachusetts in 2002
 Doctor of Laws degree from St. John’s University in New York City in 2002.

Murphy served as a trustee of The Catholic University of America in Washington, D.C.  He is a knight commander with Star of the Equestrian Order of the Holy Sepulchre of Jerusalem, ecclesiastical commander of grace in the Sacred Military Constantinian Order of St. George, and assistant chaplain of the American Association of the Sovereign Order of Malta in 2002.

See also
 

 Catholic Church hierarchy
 Catholic Church in the United States
 Historical list of the Catholic bishops of the United States
 List of Catholic bishops of the United States
 Lists of patriarchs, archbishops, and bishops

References

External links
The Roman Catholic Diocese of Rockville Centre Official Site
Biography of Bishop Murphy (Official Diocesan Homepage)

Episcopal succession

1940 births
Living people
20th-century Roman Catholic bishops in the United States
Catholic University of America trustees
Pontifical Gregorian University alumni
Boston Latin School alumni
Saint John's Seminary (Massachusetts) alumni
21st-century Roman Catholic bishops in the United States